This article provides details on candidates for the 2006 Victorian election, held on 25 November 2006.

Retiring MPs

Labor
Mary Delahunty MLA (Northcote) – announced retirement October 2006.
Sherryl Garbutt MLA (Bundoora) – retired.
Mary Gillett MLA (Tarneit) – lost preselection.
Michael Leighton MLA (Preston) – retired.
Peter Loney MLA (Lara) – retired after it became clear he would lose preselection.
Bruce Mildenhall MLA (Footscray) – retired.
Dale Wilson MLA (Narre Warren South) – lost preselection.
Helen Buckingham MLC (Koonung Province) – retired due to ill health.
Monica Gould MLC (Doutta Galla Province) – retired.
Geoff Hilton MLC (Western Port Province – lost preselection.
John McQuilten MLC (Ballarat Province) – retired.
Sang Nguyen MLC (Melbourne West Province) – lost preselection.

Liberal
Robin Cooper MLA (Mornington) – retired.
Robert Doyle MLA (Malvern) – retired.
Phil Honeywood MLA (Warrandyte) – retired.
Victor Perton MLA (Doncaster) – retired.
Tony Plowman MLA (Benambra) – retired.
Ron Bowden MLC (South Eastern Province) – retired.
Andrew Brideson MLC (Waverley Province) – retired.
Bill Forwood MLC (Templestowe Province) – retired.
Graeme Stoney MLC (Central Highlands Province) – retired.
Chris Strong MLC (Higinbotham Province) – lost preselection.

National
Noel Maughan MLA (Rodney) – retired.
Barry Bishop MLC (North Western Province) – retired.

Independent
Carolyn Hirsh MLC (Silvan Province) – elected as Labor.
Andrew Olexander MLC (Silvan Province) – elected as Liberal.

Legislative Assembly

Sitting members are shown in bold text. Successful candidates are highlighted in the relevant colour. Where there is possible confusion, an asterisk (*) is also used.

Legislative Council

The 40 members of the Legislative Council were elected under a proportional representation system. Each region elected five members. Sitting members are shown in bold text. Tickets that elected at least one MLC are highlighted in the relevant colour. Successful candidates are identified by an asterisk (*).

Eastern Metropolitan

Eastern Victoria

Northern Metropolitan

Northern Victoria

South Eastern Metropolitan

Southern Metropolitan

Western Metropolitan

Western Victoria

Preselected candidates who resigned
Jack Reilly resigned as the No 1 People Power candidate for Northern Metropolitan on Saturday 16 September 2006.
Helen Buckingham resigned as the No 3 ALP candidate for Eastern Metropolitan.
Mary Delahunty resigned as the ALP incumbent candidate for Northcote.
Stephen Mayne resigned as the No. 1 People Power candidate for Southern Metropolitan on 18 October 2006, but he reversed this decision on 1 November 2006.
Wally Rogers resigned as the Liberal candidate for Yuroke due to illness.
Frank Dawood resigned as the Liberal candidate for Dandenong.
Andrew Olexander did not nominate after all

See also
 Members of the Victorian Legislative Assembly, 2002-2006
 Members of the Victorian Legislative Council, 2002-2006
 2006 Victorian state election
 Results of the Victorian state election, 2006

References
National Executive finalises Victorian Upper House Ticket, 14 March 2006
Liberal Candidates for the 2006 Election
Peter Hall to stand for Gippsland Province
Nationals ticket for Northern Region, 8 May 2006
People Power Victorian Candidates, 7 June 2006
People Power Victorian State Election, 7 June 2006
Country Alliance:  Rural – Regional – Recreational Candidates, 7 June 2006
Stefano de Pieri – Candidate for Northern Victoria Region, 7 June 2006
Democratic Labor Party (DLP) of Australia – http://www.dlp.org.au, 20 June 2006
Liberal Candidates for the 2006 Election, 21 June 2006
The Age – Another party shooting at its own foot – Warrandyte Liberal pre-selection, 30 June 2006
Greens Candidates

Victoria
Candidates for Victorian state elections
Victorian Legislative Assembly